The 2000 Volvo Women's Open  was a women's tennis tournament played on outdoor hard courts in Pattaya, Thailand. It was part of Tier IVb of the 2000 WTA Tour. It was the 10th edition of the tournament and was held from 13 November through 19 November 2000. Third-seeded Anne Kremer won the singles title and earned $18,000 first-prize money.

Finals

Singles

 Anne Kremer defeated  Tatiana Panova, 6–1, 6–4
 This was Kremer's second singles title of the year and of her career.

Doubles

 Yayuk Basuki /  Caroline Vis defeated  Tina Križan /  Katarina Srebotnik, 6–3, 6–3

References

External links
 ITF tournament edition details 
 Tournament draws

 
 WTA Tour
 in women's tennis
Tennis, WTA Tour, Volvo Women's Open
Tennis, WTA Tour, Volvo Women's Open

Tennis, WTA Tour, Volvo Women's Open